Fakhri Aqil Husaini (born 27 July 1965 in Lhokseumawe) is an Indonesian football coach. As a player, he played as a midfielder and captained the Indonesian national team.

Honours 
Indonesia U-16
 AFF U-16 Youth Championship: 2018

References

External links
  

1997 births
Living people
Sportspeople from Aceh
Association football midfielders
Indonesian footballers
Indonesia international footballers
Indonesian football managers
People from Lhokseumawe